Oleg Sergeyevich Chistyakov (born 21 April 1976) is a Russian professional football coach and a former player.

Club career
He played in the Russian Football National League for FC Metallurg Lipetsk in 1998.

External links
 

1976 births
People from Cherepovets
Living people
Russian footballers
FC Kuban Krasnodar players
Association football forwards
FC Metallurg Lipetsk players
Russian football managers
FC Oryol players
FC Arsenal Tula players
FC Dynamo Vologda players
FC Sheksna Cherepovets players
FC Spartak Kostroma players
FC Bulat Cherepovets players
FC Tekstilshchik Ivanovo players
Sportspeople from Vologda Oblast